Thailand competed in the 2022 World Games in Birmingham, United States from 7 to 17 July 2022. The games were originally scheduled for July 2021, but were postponed due to the rescheduling of the Tokyo 2020 Olympic Games. Athletes representing Thailand won four gold medals, three silver medals and two bronze medals. The country finished in 18th place in the medal table.

Medalists

Competitors
The following is the list of number of competitors in the Games.

Air sports

Thailand qualified one pilot in drone racing at the World Games, as a result of the FAI The World Games 2022 Women Selection List.

Billiards sports

Thailand qualified one snooker player in men's singles snooker at the World Games by finishing as runner-up at the 2022 IBSF World Under-21 Snooker Championships in Doha, Qatar.

Boules sports

Thailand qualified two pétanque players in women's pétanque doubles at the World Games. Phantipha Wongchuvej and Nantawan Fueangsanit receive one spot in women's doubles by finishing in the first place at the 2019 FIPJP Women's Doubles Pétanque World Championships in Almería, Spain. Phantipha Wongchuvej  also qualified in women's pétanque precision shooting.

Pétanque classic

Pétanque precision shooting

Floorball

Thailand men's floorball team qualified for the World Games by securing an outright berth as the highest-ranked team from Asia and Oceania at the 2020 IFF Men's World Floorball Championships in Helsinki, Finland.

Summary

Group play

Seventh place game

Ju-jitsu

Thailand qualified five (one male and four female) ju-jitsu practitioners into the World Games, as a result of the JIIF The World Games 2022 Qualification Rankings.

Duo

Fighting

Ne-waza

Muaythai

Thailand competed in muaythai.

Sumo

Thailand competed in sumo.

Middleweight
Main rounds

Repechages

Openweight
Main rounds

Repechages

Water skiing

Thailand competed in water skiing.

Wushu

Thailand competed in wushu.

References

Nations at the 2022 World Games
2022
World Games